John Franklin Cassels (October 27, 1852 - June 2, 1930) was a Democratic member of the Mississippi House of Representatives, representing Amite County, from 1916 to 1920.

Biography 
John Franklin Cassels was born on October 27, 1852, near Mt. Carmel, in Wilkinson County, Mississippi. His parents were John Cassels and Sarah Nix (Collinsworth) Cassels. He married Lettie Virginia Jackson in 1879. In 1915, he was elected to the Mississippi House of Representatives, representing Amite County, as a Democrat. He died on June 2, 1930, in Mississippi, and was buried in Amite County.

References 

1852 births
1930 deaths
People from Wilkinson County, Mississippi
Democratic Party members of the Mississippi House of Representatives
People from Amite County, Mississippi